Welwyn Wilton Katz (born June 7, 1948) is a Canadian children's author who has lived in Kitchener and Toronto, Ontario.  In 1994 she was awarded the Vicky Metcalf Award.  She currently lives in London, Ontario.

She gave an interview.

Works
The Prophecy of Tau Ridoo - 1982
Witchery Hill - 1984
Sun God, Moon Witch - 1986
False Face - 1987 (nominated for a Governor General's Award)
The Third Magic - 1988 (winner of the 1988 Governor General's Award for Children's Literature)
Whale Singer - 1990 (nominated for a Governor General's Award)
Come Like Shadows - 1993
 Time Ghost (1995, Margaret K. McElderry) 
Out of the Dark - 1995 (nominated for a Governor General's Award) which was also used by A & J for Lit Circles in Carnduff Education Complex in Grade 6. It was on the year of 2010. The school is located in Carnduff, Saskatchewan, Canada.
Beowulf - 1999

References

External links
Home Page of Welwyn Wilton Katz

1948 births
Living people
Canadian children's writers
Canadian fantasy writers
Governor General's Award-winning children's writers